The 1977 South Pacific Championships was an Association of Tennis Professionals men's tournament held on outdoor grass courts at the Milton Courts in Brisbane, Queensland, Australia that was part of the One Star category of the 1977 Grand Prix tennis circuit. It was the fourth edition of the tournament and was held from 10 October until 16 October 1977. First-seeded Vitas Gerulaitis won the singles title.

Finals

Singles
 Vitas Gerulaitis defeated  Tony Roche 6–7(2–7), 6–1, 6–1, 7–5
 It was Gerulaitis' 3rd singles title of the year and the 6th of his career.

Doubles
 Vitas Gerulaitis /  Bill Scanlon defeated  Mal Anderson /  Ken Rosewall 7–6, 6–4

References

External links
 ITF tournament details

South Pacific Championships
South Pacific Championships, 1977
South Pacific Championships
South Pacific Championships
Sports competitions in Brisbane
Tennis in Queensland